Hēni Materoa Carroll  (1852 or 1856 – 1 Nov 1930), also known at Te Huinga, was a leader of the Te Aitanga-a-Māhaki and wife of politician James Carroll.

She became chief of her people when her mother died in 1887.  When her husband was elected to Parliament she remained in Gisborne.  During World War I she dedicated efforts to supporting Māori soldiers, and became chairperson of the Eastern Māori Patriotic Association.  She was appointed an Officer of the Order of the British Empire in the 1918 New Year Honours.

Kingi Areta Keiha was her brother's son.

References

1930 deaths
1850s births
Te Aitanga-a-Māhaki people
New Zealand Officers of the Order of the British Empire
New Zealand Anglicans